Kalatak may refer to:
 Kalatak, Bandar Abbas, Hormozgan Province
 Kalatak, Minab, Hormozgan Province
 Kalatak Sar, Hormozgan Province
 Kalatak, Kerman
 Kalatak, Kohgiluyeh and Boyer-Ahmad
 Kalatak, Mehrestan, Sistan and Baluchestan
 Kalatak, Saravan, Sistan and Baluchestan